El Salvador: Another Vietnam is a 1981 American documentary film directed by Glenn Silber. This political documentary illustrates the turbulent history of El Salvador from the 1920s-1970s, and the role of the U.S. government in that history. As the title suggests, the presence of U.S. military advisors in a country fighting against socialist guerrilla factions is highly reminiscent of the beginnings of the U.S. escalation of the war in Vietnam. It was nominated for the Academy Award for Best Documentary Feature.

References

External links

1981 films
1981 documentary films
American documentary films
Documentary films about war
Documentary films about American politics
History of El Salvador
El Salvador–United States relations
Documentary films about Latin American military dictatorships
Films about the Salvadoran Civil War
1980s English-language films
1980s American films